Peter Gill VC (September 1831 – 26 July 1868) was  born in St Paul's Parish, Dublin and was an Irish recipient of the Victoria Cross, the highest and most prestigious award for gallantry in the face of the enemy that can be awarded to British and Commonwealth forces.

Details
Gill was approximately 25 years old, and a sergeant-major in the Loodiana Regiment, during the Indian Mutiny on 4 June 1857 at Benares, India when he (and Sergeant-Major Matthew Rosamund) were awarded the Victoria Cross for the following deeds:

Gill later achieved the rank of lieutenant. He was killed in action at Morar, Gwalior, Madhya Pradesh, India, on 26 July 1868.

References

Listed in order of publication year 
The Register of the Victoria Cross (1981, 1988 and 1997)

Ireland's VCs  (Dept of Economic Development 1995)
Monuments to Courage (David Harvey, 1999)
Irish Winners of the Victoria Cross (Richard Doherty & David Truesdale, 2000)

1831 births
1868 deaths
19th-century Irish people
Irish soldiers in the British East India Company Army
Military personnel from Dublin (city)
Irish recipients of the Victoria Cross
Indian Rebellion of 1857 recipients of the Victoria Cross
British East India Company Army soldiers
Bengal Staff Corps officers
British Indian Army personnel killed in action
Irish soldiers in the British Indian Army